Andrea di Bonaiuto da Firenze or Andrea da Firenze (I) (active 1343 – 1377) was an Italian painter active in Florence.

He was probably born in Florence where he was active from 1343. His earliest works suggest that he must have been in close contact with the workshop of Andrea di Cione.

Andrea di Bonaiuto is known for his stained glass window of the Coronation of Mary in the Basilica of Santa Maria Novella, and his fresco decorations in the Spanish chapel (then called Cappellone degli Spagnoli) of the chapter house there.  The central theme of the fresco's in the Spanish chapel is the glorification of the Dominican Order.

From mid 1366 to mid 1367 Andrea di Bonaiuto was one of the artists advising on the construction of the Florence Cathedral.

He died in Pisa while working on a fresco on the Legend of St Raneiro at the Camposanto Monumentale.

Although a follower of traditional models, Andrea di Bonaiuto brought innovation by softening details and contours with soft and blended shadows and emphasizing the two-dimensional aspect of the painted surface through painted and punched decorative effects.

Notes

External links

1320s births
1377 deaths
14th-century Italian painters
Italian male painters
Painters from Florence